Forró and Redemptive Regionalism from the Brazilian Northeast: Popular Music in a Culture of Migration is a book by professor of Portuguese Jack A. Draper III, published by Peter Lang in 2010.

Synopsis 
Forró and Redemptive Regionalism from the Brazilian Northeast not only documents and analyses the music of migrants in Brazil, but also analyzes how the music shaped both its creators and Brazil as a whole. Using forró artists and excerpts from their music, Draper argues that the migrants used a musical genre called forró to kill saudade, which means longing and nostalgia, loneliness and lust, as He also argues that it was used to rebel against industrialization and used as an attempt to help Brazilian “natives” overcome prejudice. He analyzes the historical and political climate that forró formed in, a time of oppression, dictatorships and political instability. Draper seems to be portraying forró like a Brazilian equivalent of Blues, which was also used to fight longing, loneliness and lust. He argues and analyses how the migrants completely re-thought all the elements of music, including melody, lyrics and rhythms to make it their own. He also shows forró’s presence in Brazilian pop culture, including the teaching of it in universities, and the playing of it at nightclubs and music festivals.

Critical Reception 
Forró and Redemptive Regionalism from the Brazilian Northeast  has been reviewed by Reference & Research Book News.

References 

2010 non-fiction books
Books about Brazil
Peter Lang academic journals